Coniostola is a genus of moths belonging to the subfamily Olethreutinae of the family Tortricidae.

Species
Some species of this genus are:
Coniostola calculosa (Meyrick, 1913) (from Mauritius, Mozambique & South Africa)
Coniostola flavitinctana   Agassiz & Aarvik, 2014 (from Kenya & Tanzania)
Coniostola laikipiana   Agassiz & Aarvik, 2014 (from Kenya)
Coniostola lobostola (Meyrick, 1918) (from Mozambique)
Coniostola rufitinctana   Agassiz & Aarvik, 2014 (from Kenya)
Coniostola seira Razowski & Wojtusiak, 2012 (from Nigeria)
Coniostola separata Razowski & Trematerra, 2010 (from Ethiopia)
Coniostola solivaga Razowski & Wojtusiak, 2012 (from Nigeria)
Coniostola stereoma (Meyrick, 1912) (Africa & southern Asia)
Coniostola symbola (Meyrick, 1909) (from South Africa)

See also
List of Tortricidae genera

References

External links
tortricidae.com

Tortricidae genera
Olethreutinae
Taxa named by Alexey Diakonoff